Aristotelia sphenomorpha is a moth of the family Gelechiidae. It was described by Edward Meyrick in 1930. It is found in northern Vietnam.

References

Moths described in 1930
Aristotelia (moth)
Moths of Asia